Oswald Lewis (5 April 1887 – 12 February 1966) was a British businessman, barrister, and Conservative politician.

Early life 
Born in Hampstead, north west London, Oswald Lewis was the younger son of John Lewis, founder of the chain of department stores that bears his name, and Eliza Baker. He was educated at Westminster School and Christ Church, Oxford where he received the Boulter Exhibition in Law and graduated with an honours degree in jurisprudence. He was called to the bar at the Middle Temple in 1912, but never practised. In 1911 he joined the 2nd County of London Yeomanry (Westminster Dragoons), and served in Egypt  during the First World War.

Business career 
Lewis was a partner in John Lewis & Company until his father's death in 1928, when he sold his shares to his brother John Spedan Lewis.

Lewis returned to business after his political career came to an end; he was a member of the Worshipful Company of Farriers of the City of London, and was master of the company in 1952.

Political career 
Although originally affiliated to the Liberal Party, having been a prospective parliamentary candidate for North Dorset, by 1928 he had moved to the Conservatives. In December 1928 he was chosen as Conservative candidate to defend the seat of Colchester at the upcoming general election. He was elected as Member of Parliament (MP) and entered the House of Commons upon the 30 May 1929 election. He held the seat until his defeat at the 1945 general election by George Smith, who became Colchester's first and only Labour MP. Throughout his political tenure, Lewis chaired a number of standing and select committees.

In 1908 Lewis entered local politics when he was elected to St Marylebone Borough Council at a byelection. He was supported by both the Conservative and Liberal parties against a Labour Party candidate. He remained on the council until 1912. In 1913 he was elected to the London County Council to represent Hoxton for the Liberal-backed Progressive Party. He sat on the council until 1919.

Personal life 

On the year 1928, Lewis married Frances Merriman and the couple had two children, including Peter. Lewis was the owner of Beechwood, a Grade II listed Georgian house in 11 acres of grounds in Highgate, north London.

He died at Beechwood on the 12th February 1966, aged 78, and is buried on the western side of Highgate Cemetery, on the main path near the entrance to the Egyptian Avenue.

References

External links 

Conservative Party (UK) MPs for English constituencies
UK MPs 1929–1931
People educated at Westminster School, London
UK MPs 1931–1935
UK MPs 1935–1945
1887 births
1966 deaths
Burials at Highgate Cemetery
Progressive Party (London) politicians
Members of London County Council
Members of the Middle Temple
Alumni of Christ Church, Oxford
Westminster Dragoons officers
Members of St Marylebone Metropolitan Borough Council
People from Hampstead